In mathematics, an element (or member) of a set is any one of the distinct objects that belong to that set.

Sets
Writing  means that the elements of the set  are the numbers 1, 2, 3 and 4.

Sets can themselves be elements. For example, consider the set .

The elements of a set can be anything.

Notation and terminology
The relation "is an element of", also called set membership, is denoted by the symbol "∈". Writing

means that "x is an element of A". Equivalent expressions are "x is a member of A", "x belongs to A", "x is in A" and "x lies in A". The expressions "A includes x" and "A contains x" are also used to mean set membership, although some authors use them to mean instead "x is a subset of A". Logician George Boolos strongly urged that "contains" be used for membership only, and "includes" for the subset relation only.

For the relation ∈ , the converse relation ∈T may be written

 meaning "A contains or includes x".

The negation of set membership is denoted by the symbol "∉". Writing
 means that "x is not an element of A".

The symbol ∈ was first used by Giuseppe Peano, in his 1889 work . Here he wrote on page X:

which means

The symbol ∈ means is. So a ∈ b is read as a is a certain b; …

The symbol itself is a stylized lowercase Greek letter epsilon ("ϵ"), the first letter of the word , which means "is".

Cardinality of sets

The number of elements in a particular set is a property known as cardinality; informally, this is the size of a set. In the above examples, the cardinality of the set A is 4, while the cardinality of set B and set C are both 3. An infinite set is a set with an infinite number of elements, while a finite set is a set with a finite number of elements. The above examples are examples of finite sets. An example of an infinite set is the set of positive integers {1, 2, 3, 4, ...}.

Examples
Using the sets defined above, namely A = {1, 2, 3, 4 }, B = {1, 2, {3, 4}} and C = {red, green, blue}, the following statements are true:
2 ∈ A
5 ∉ A

{3,4} ∈ B
3 ∉ B
4 ∉ B
yellow ∉ C

Formal relation
As a relation, set membership must have a domain and a range. Conventionally the domain is called the universe denoted U. The range is the set of subsets of U called the power set of U and denoted P(U). Thus the relation  is a subset of U x P(U). The converse relation  is a subset of P(U) x U.

See also 

 Identity element
 Singleton (mathematics)

References

Further reading
 - "Naive" means that it is not fully axiomatized, not that it is silly or easy (Halmos's treatment is neither).

 - Both the notion of set (a collection of members), membership or element-hood, the axiom of extension, the axiom of separation, and the union axiom (Suppes calls it the sum axiom) are needed for a more thorough understanding of "set element".

Basic concepts in set theory